Lex-Tyger Lobinger (born 22 February 1999) is a German professional footballer who plays as a centre-forward for  club 1. FC Kaiserslautern.

Career
Lobinger made his professional debut for Fortuna Düsseldorf in the 2. Bundesliga on 8 May 2021, coming on as a substitute in the 88th minute for Shinta Appelkamp. The home match finished as a 2–2 draw.

On 1 July 2022, Lobinger signed with 1. FC Kaiserslautern.

Personal life
Lobinger is the son of pole vaulter Tim Lobinger and triple jumper Petra Lobinger née Laux, who both represented Germany at the Summer Olympic Games.

References

External links
 
 
 
 

1999 births
Living people
Sportspeople from Bonn
German footballers
Footballers from North Rhine-Westphalia
Association football forwards
2. Bundesliga players
Regionalliga players
SG Wattenscheid 09 players
Fortuna Düsseldorf II players
Fortuna Düsseldorf players
1. FC Kaiserslautern players